The Church Historian's Press is an imprint dedicated to publishing scholarly works about the origin, history, and growth of the Church of Jesus Christ of Latter-day Saints (LDS Church).  It is owned by the LDS Church and operated under the direction of the Church Historian and Recorder.

The press is the publisher of the Joseph Smith Papers, a documentary editing project that seeks to provide scholars and researches with access to all of the original documents produced by Joseph Smith, founder of the LDS Church.  When complete, the Joseph Smith Papers will contain about two dozen printed volumes, as well as online publications.

The press was also intended to publish other LDS Church documentary histories, such as the significant journals of 19th-century Apostle George Q. Cannon (the first volume was already published by Deseret Book in 1999).  In April 2016, this project was instead launched as a searchable website for The Journal of George Q. Cannon, with plans to provide nearly all the journals online and save years in what would be required for print publication.  Also in 2016, the CH Press began publication of historic papers of the Relief Society.

The CH Press website was launched on February 2, 2016.

See also
Joseph Smith Papers
Relief Society Documents Project

Notes

External links 
 Official website
 Joseph Smith Papers website

Companies based in Salt Lake City
Book publishing companies based in Utah
History of the Church of Jesus Christ of Latter-day Saints
Organizational subdivisions of the Church of Jesus Christ of Latter-day Saints
Publishing companies established in 2008
2008 establishments in Utah